Charles Joseph Quinn (born 11 March 1902) was a Scottish footballer who played as a full back for Portsmouth as well as non league football for a number of other clubs.

References

Portsmouth F.C. players
Rochdale A.F.C. players
Troon F.C. players
Guildford City F.C. players
Peterborough & Fletton United F.C. players
Queen of the South F.C. players
Aldershot F.C. players
Folkestone F.C. players
Hamilton Academical F.C. players
Bangor City F.C. players
Llanelli Town A.F.C. players
Scottish footballers
Association football fullbacks
Footballers from Kilmarnock
1902 births
Year of death missing